Wartislaw II ( ~ 1160 – ~ 1184) was a duke of Pomerania-Demmin. He either was a son of Bogislaw I and Walburga of Denmark, or Wartislaw of the Swantiboride sideline of the Griffins, castellan of Szczecin.

Wartislaw II was a son of Bogislaw I, duke of Pomerania-Stettin and his first wife Walburga of Denmark. He was married to Sophia of Poland, yet they had no children. Wartislaw received Pomerania-Demmin after Casimir I of Pomerania-Demmin died in 1180. 

This version is challenged by Adolf Hofmeister (1883–1956), who states that he has been confused with the Swantiboride castellan of Szczecin, Wartislaw (Wartislaw Swantiboricz or Swantiboriz), who is known to have been one of the legal guardians of Casimir II, who would be the next duke to rule Pomerania-Demmin.

See also
List of Pomeranian duchies and dukes
History of Pomerania
Duchy of Pomerania
House of Pomerania

Sources
Wegener, W: Die Herzöge von Pommern aus dem Greifen-Hause ca. 1100 bis 1637 (Genealogische Tafeln zur mittelalterlichen Geschichte, 3), 2. Auflage Göttingen 1962.

12th-century births
12th-century deaths
Dukes of Pomerania
Place of birth unknown